Abū Isḥāq Ibrāhīm Ibn Sayyār Ibn Hāni‘ an-Naẓẓām (c. 775 – c. 845) was an Arab Mu'tazilite theologian and poet. He was a nephew of the Mu'tazilite theologian Abu al-Hudhayl al-'Allaf, and al-Jahiz was one of his students. Al-Naẓẓām served at the courts of the Abbasid Caliph al-Mamun. His theological doctrines and works are lost except for a few fragments.

Views

Beliefs
Diverging from many of the diverse held views of his time, he was famous for his strong rejection of analogical reasoning, which was accepted by both the Hanafites and Shafi'ites; of juristic preference, a pillar of Hanafite thought; of the doctrine of binding consensus, accepted by all of Sunni Islam; and of the reports supposedly transmitting prophetic traditions as narrated by Abu Hurayra, accepted by Muslims of many sects.Ibrahim an nazzam was a rejecter of all hadith writings and saw the Quran as the only valid source of jurisprudence

Critique of Abu Hurayra and his reported Hadiths
Like other early Mu'tazilites, al-Naẓẓām was a scripturalist who had no use for the traditions and accounts supposedly related by Abu Hurayra, the most prolific ḥadīth narrater, which he held to be full of incongruities. For al-Naẓẓām, both of the so-called single-source and multiple-source reports, such as the multitudinous narratives variously attributed to Abu Hurayra, could not be trusted. Al-Naẓẓām bolstered his refutation of the thitherto long-held esteem of the accounts of Abu Hurayra and other contemporaries of Muḥammad (especially among Sunni circles) within the larger claim that such reports circulated and thrived mainly to support and legitimize the polemical causes of various theological sects and jurists and that no single transmitter, be he contemporaneous with Muhammad or not, could by himself be held above suspicion of altering the content of any single report. Al-Naẓẓām’s skepticism involved far more than excluding the possible verification of a report narrated by Abu Hurayra, whether it is traced back to a single source (wāḥid) or many (mutawātir). He also questioned reports of widespread acceptance, which proved pivotal to classical Muʿtazilite criteria devised for verifying the single report, thus earning a special mention for the depth and extent of his skepticism.

Critique of judicial consensus
Al-Naẓẓām's rejection of consensus was primarily due to his rationalist criticism of some the first generation of Muslims, whom he viewed as possessing defective personalities and intellects. Shi'ite theologians al-Shaykh al-Mufīd and Sharif al-Murtaza held in high esteem al-Naẓẓām's Kitāb al-Nakth (The Book of Dismantling), in which he denied the doctrinal validity of consensus.

References

Year of birth uncertain
9th-century deaths
Quranist Muslims
9th-century Muslim theologians
Mu'tazilites
9th-century people from the Abbasid Caliphate
8th-century Arabs
9th-century Arabs